Wodzisław Śląski is a city in Silesian Voivodeship, southern Poland with 47,992 inhabitants (2019). It is the seat of Wodzisław County.

Geography

Location
Wodzisław Śląski is an urban gmina in the south-eastern part of Upper Silesia, now in Silesian Voivodeship in south Poland, within the south portion of the Upper Silesian Coal Basin. It borders the towns of Pszów, Radlin and villages Marklowice, Mszana, Godów, Gorzyce and Lubomia. It lies between the Vistula and Oder rivers, near Czech border in the foreground Moravian Gate. Several rivers flow through the city, the major two being the Leśnica and "Zawadka" rivers. Within  of Wodzisław Śląski are the capital cities of six countries: Berlin, Vienna, Prague, Bratislava, Budapest and Warsaw.

Climate
The climate of the area is continental humid. The area's characteristic weak and medium winds blow at about 4 m/s from the south-west (Moravian Gate).

Districts
The town is divided into 9 districts that have its own administrative body:
Jedłownik Szyb
Jedłownik-Turzyczka-Karkoszka 
Kokoszyce 
 (new city)
Trzy Wzgórza (Three Hills)
Radlin II
Stare Miasto (old city)
Wilchwy 
Zawada

History
Being a borderland town, Wodzisław Śląski is a centre of the Wodzisław County, formed during a historical process lasting many centuries. Rich excavations the oldest finds dated back to the Stone Age give evidence about its ancient inhabitants.

Middle Ages

The city's name derives from the Piast Duke Władysław of Opole. He located the city and established the Wodzisław monastery about 1257.

The city's origins can be traced back into the 10th and 11th century, when three Slavic settlements existed on Wodzisław's present-day territory which eventually merged to form one town. In the course of the medieval eastward migration of Flemish and German settlers (Ostsiedlung), Wodzisław, as many other Polish settlements, was incorporated (granted city status and right) according to the so-called Magdeburg Law at some point before 1257 (the exact date remains unknown). This, however, is not to be confused with a change in national affiliation; Wodzisław continued to be part of the Kingdom of Poland, until Silesia as a whole became a fiefdom of the Bohemian crown in 1327. At that times of Duchess Constance, the town developed fast. Wodzisław was one of the most populated and richest towns of Upper Silesia. In 14 and 15th century the city continued to grow and developed into a regional trade centre. In the 15th century, the Hussites devastated the city. From 1526, Bohemia, including the fiefdom of Silesia, which Wodzisław was a part of, came under the authority of the Habsburg crown.

Early Modern Age
In 16th and 17th century and during the time of the Thirty Years' War, Wodzisław been part of the Habsburg Empire. After the end of the Thirty Years' War Wodzisław was destroyed. Never back to  Middle Ages' "golden time". At the beginning of the War of the Austrian Succession between King Frederick II of Prussia (the Great) and the Habsburg empress Maria Theresa of Austria, the greatest part of Silesia, including Wodzisław, was annexed by the Kingdom of Prussia in 1740, which Austria eventually recognized in 1763. In 1815 the city became part of the Prussian Province of Silesia and was located in the Rybnik district. Coal mining gained importance for Wodzisław's economy as early as the 19th century.

20th century
After the end of World War I in 1918, Polish statehood was restored. Amidst an atmosphere of ethnic unrest, a referendum was organized to determine the future national affiliation of Upper Silesia. Although an overall majority had opted for Germany, the area was divided in an attempt to satisfy both parties. Although both parties considered the territory they were assigned insufficient, the division was justified insofar as in the German and Polish parts a majority had voted in favour of the respective nation.

The lowest numbers of pro-German votes were registered in the districts of Rybnik and Pszczyna (Pless). In the town Wodzisław (Loslau), out of 2,333 votes, 1,669 (72%) were in favour of Germany and 662 (28%) were in favour of Poland. However, the Rybnik district as a whole voted in favour of Poland with a 65% majority. The town and the largest part of the district were attached to the territory of the Second Polish Republic; Wodzisław thus became part of a Polish state for the first time since 1335 when Poland had ceded Silesia to Bohemia in the Treaty of Trentschin. The Upper Silesia plebiscite and eventual division of Upper Silesia were accompanied by three Silesian Uprisings of Polish militants. Within the Second Polish Republic of the interwar period, Wodzisław was part of the Silesian Voivodeship, which enjoyed far-reaching political and financial autonomy.

With the outbreak of World War II in 1939, the border city Wodzisław returned under the rule of Germany, being in the part of Poland that was directly incorporated into the German state. The population was ethnically categorized and either "re-Germanized" or disfranchised and partially deported into the General Government as Poles.

When the Soviet army advanced on Poland, nine days before the Soviets arrived, the Schutzstaffel had marched 60,000 prisoners out of the camp. Approximately 15,000 prisoners died on the way. There is a memorial to the victims of the Holocaust from Wodzisław in the Baron Hirsch Cemetery Staten Island, New York  where the Wodzisław  landsmanshaft has a section.

In March 1945 the Soviet army arrived near Wodzisław. Approximately 80% of the town was destroyed in World War II. From 26 March 1945 Wodzisław was once more integrated into Poland. The Old Town, including the Market Square, was fully restored after the war.

Transport
Wodzisław Śląski is situated at the junction of several major lines of road, railway and air communication. Only  from center the town crossing motorway A1. The town is crossed by one national road ( "DK78" ) and tree regional roads running from Gliwice to Ostrava and regional roads from Żory and Jastrzębie Zdrój to Racibórz ( "DW932", "DW933", "DW936" ). The railway junction at "Wodzisław Śląski" is a major transshipment point.

Economy

Wodzisław Śląski is center and capital of the Wodzisław County. City is situated on the main highway from nord Poland to south Poland and border with Czech Republic.

Coal centre
Wodzisław Śląski is a medium coal and industrial centre. Although there is no coal mines in the town (1 Maja Coal Mine closed in 2001), there are a few in its neighborhood (Radlin – Marcel Coal Mine, Pszów, Rydułtowy – Rydułtowy-Anna Coal Mine, Jastrzębie – Jas-Mos Coal Mine) and a coke manufacture in Radlin.

Culture

The town has one library, one museum and one cinema.

Tourism

In contrast to the central part of the Upper Silesian industry area, located a short distance to the north, Wodzisław enjoys the reputation of a "green" city having a relatively clean environment. While the city is no centre of tourism, it does have various interesting sights and opportunities for recreation. The Beskidy Mountains, a popular recreational area for skiing, are within one-hour drive also  from town along the Odra river are interesting natural reserve and at summer places for swimming.

Sights
 the medieval gothic church, dedicated to the Holy Trinity (pol. Kościół św. Trójcy), erected in 1257;
 the Monastery from 17th century ( "Klasztor franciszkański" ), erected in 1257;
 the neo-gothic church of "Assumption of St. Mary" (Kościół WNMP),
 the building of the former district authority (19th century),
 the neo-classical Wall tower ("Baszta rycerska"),
 the Classicist Palace oldest in Poland from 1745. (Today Museum),
 the old town square (Rynek),
 the Palace in Kokoszyce (Pałac w Kokoszycach), built in 1823,
 the Synagogue (Synagoga) from 1826 ( today "Rosmann")
 the Balaton small lake in the forest (Grodzisko)

Education
In Wodzisław Śląski there are:
 19 kindergartens
 13 primary schools
 4 gimnasia
 5 high schools
 2 colleges

Sport
Odra Wodzisław – football team
MOSiR Stadium
WSP Wodzisław Śląski (juniors)

Notable people

Constance, Duchess of Wodzisław (?–1351), princess from the House of Piast and sovereign Duchess of Wodzisław Śląski from 1324 until her death
Benjamin Wolf Löw (1775–1851), Polish–Hungarian rabbi
Paweł Pośpiech (1879–1922), priest, activist and journalist
Bolesław Kominek (1903–1974), Cardinal of the Roman Catholic Church
Stanisław Oślizło (born 1937), footballer
Idzi Panic (born 1952), historian
Henryk Siedlaczek (born 1956), politician
Ryszard Wieczorek (born 1962), football coach and former player
Tomasz Sikora (born 1973), biathlete and Olympic medalist
Leszek Blanik (born 1977), gymnast, World and Olympic champion in vault
Wojtek Czyz (born 1980), German Paralympic athlete
Mariusz Pawełek (born 1981), footballer
Claudia Ciesla (born 1987), Polish-German model and actress, best known for her work in Bollywood
Kamil Wilczek (born 1988), footballer

Twin towns – sister cities

Wodzisław Śląski is twinned with:

 Alanya, Turkey
 Artik, Armenia
 Gladbeck, Germany
 Karviná, Czech Republic
 Sallaumines, France
 Siret, Romania

Gallery

References

External links
 http://www.Wodzislaw-Slaski.pl/
 http://www.wodzislaw.zobacz.slask.pl/
 Jewish Community in Wodzisław Śląski on Virtual Shtetl

 
Cities and towns in Silesian Voivodeship
Wodzisław County
Populated places established in the 13th century
Historic Jewish communities
Socialist planned cities